Aleksi Leppä (born 2 September 1994) is a Finnish sport shooter.

He participated at the 2018 ISSF World Shooting Championships, winning two gold medals.

Leppä's coach is his father, Marko Leppä.

References

External links

 

Living people
1994 births
Finnish male sport shooters
ISSF rifle shooters
People from Hamina
Sportspeople from Kymenlaakso
21st-century Finnish people